KTTY is an FM radio station licensed to New Boston, Texas, and serving the Texarkana region. Owned by Texarkana Radio Center, it broadcasts a country music format branded as Hot FM, simulcasting KBYB 101.7 FM Hope, Arkansas.    Studios are located on Olive in Texarkana, Texas just one block west of the Texas/Arkansas state line and its transmitter is in New Boston.

History
KTTY originally operated as a country music station, branded as Cat Country 105.1, under the ownership of Towers Investment Trust. The station went silent in June 2012, and was sold in November 2012 to Texarkana Radio Center. On April 19, 2013, the station returned to air as classic hits Hits 105, also simulcasting on KCMC and the FM translator K288FI.

On January 24, 2017, KTTY announced that it would no longer play music by Madonna, in response to remarks she made during a speech at the Women's March on Washington on January 20, 2017. KTTY's general manager stated that their decision was "not a matter of politics", but "a matter of patriotism", because "it just feels wrong to us to be playing Madonna songs and paying her royalties when the artist has shown un-American sentiments."

On January 22, 2019, KTTY changed their format from classic hits to country, simulcasting KBYB 101.7 FM Hope, AR.

References

External links

Country radio stations in the United States
Radio stations established in 2013
2013 establishments in Texas
TTY